Papua Beach is a beach 1.5 nautical miles (2.8 km) long on the southeast shore of Cumberland West Bay, South Georgia. The name derives from "Papua Cove," now an obsolete name, applied for a minor recession of the shore of this beach by the Swedish Antarctic Expedition under Nordenskjold, 1901–04, because a colony of gentoo penguins (Pygoscelis papua) was found there. The cove was called "Pinguinbucht" on a 1907 chart by A. Szielasko, and the form Penguin Bay appears on some later charts. Following this survey in 1951–52, the SGS reported that the beach now described, rather than the cove or bay, is the significant feature for which a name is required.

Beaches of South Georgia